Claude Rogers may refer to:

 Claude Rogers (artist) (1907–1979), English painter
 Claude Ambrose Rogers (1920–2005), English mathematician